The Bishop of Limerick, Killaloe and Ardfert or the Bishop of Limerick and Killaloe (Full title: Bishop of Limerick, Ardfert, Aghadoe, Killaloe, Kilfenora, Clonfert, Kilmacduagh and Emly) is the Church of Ireland Ordinary of the united Diocese of Limerick and Killaloe in the Province of Dublin. As of January 2022, the position was vacant, but due to be taken up by Michael Burrows.

Cathedrals
The united bishopric has three cathedrals:
St Mary's Cathedral, Limerick
St Flannan's Cathedral, Killaloe
St Brendan's Cathedral, Clonfert
Five others are in ruins or no longer exist:
St Brendan's Cathedral, Ardfert was destroyed by fire in 1641
St Alibeus' Cathedral, Emly was demolished in 1877
Kilmacduagh cathedral, which is partly in ruins
Aghadoe Cathedral, which is partly in ruins
 Kilfenora Cathedral, which is partly in ruins, dates from the 12th century.

Archdeacons
For administrative purposes the diocese is divided into two Archdeaconries: Wayne Carney is the  Archdeacon of Killaloe, Kilfenora, Clonfert and Kilmacduagh; and Simon Lumby is the Archdeacon of Limerick, Ardfert and Aghadoe.

List of bishops

Episcopal combination history

See also

 List of Anglican diocesan bishops in Britain and Ireland
 List of Anglican dioceses in the United Kingdom and Ireland

References

External links
 Crockford's Clerical Directory - Listings

Limerick and Killaloe
Religion in County Clare
Limerick and Killaloe
Limerick and Killaloe
 Bishop
Archdeacons of Killaloe, Kilfenora, Clonfert and Kilmacduagh
Archdeacons of Limerick, Ardfert and Aghadoe